Corinthian Bowl was a Swedish football cup tournament played between 1906 and 1913 commemorating the English club Corinthian and their visit to Sweden in 1904.

Previous winners

Cup champions

References 

Defunct football competitions in Sweden
1906 establishments in Sweden
1913 disestablishments in Sweden
Recurring sporting events established in 1906